Zong Bing (style name Shaowen 少文, 375 – 443) was a Chinese artist and musician who wrote the earliest text on landscape painting. He wrote that  “Landscapes have a material existence, and yet reach also in a spiritual domain.”

References

 Leon Hurvitz 'Tsung Ping's Comments on Landscape Painting' Artibus Asiae, Vol. 32, No. 2/3 (1970), pp. 146–156
 Bush, S. (1983) Tsung Ping's Essay on Painting Landscape and "Landscape Buddhism" of Mount Lu. In S. Bush & C. Murick, C. (Ed), Theories of the arts in   China (pp. 132–164). Princeton, NJ: Princeton University Press.

375 births
443 deaths
Buddhist apologists
Chinese landscape painters
Jin dynasty (266–420) musicians
Jin dynasty (266–420) painters
Liu Song painters
Liu Song musicians
5th-century Chinese painters
5th-century Chinese musicians